is a private university in Owariasahi, Aichi, Japan. The school was first founded as a junior college in 1965, and it became a four-year college in 2000.

External links
 Official website 

Educational institutions established in 1965
Private universities and colleges in Japan
Universities and colleges in Aichi Prefecture
1965 establishments in Japan